Dragon Ball Z: The Return of Cooler, known in Japan as  or by Toei's own English title Dragon Ball Z: Fight! 10 Billion Power Warriors, is a 1992 Japanese anime science fiction martial arts film, the sixth Dragon Ball Z film, originally released in Japan on March 7 at the Toei Anime Fair along with the second Dragon Quest: Dai no Daibōken film and the third Magical Tarurūto-kun film.

Plot

The Namekian people, now living on a new planet after their home world was destroyed by Frieza years prior, find New Namek under siege by a mysterious, sentient spaceship that has latched onto and began attacking their home. Dende, now the Earth's guardian, senses the plight of his people and telepathically calls on Goku for help.

Goku, Gohan, Krillin, Piccolo, Oolong, Yajirobe and Master Roshi travel to the New Namek and upon arrival encounter an army of large robots abusing the Namekians. They learn that Cooler, who Goku was thought to have killed, is responsible. Cooler, now with a metallic body, reveals that he is going to absorb the planet and its lifeforms to power his ship. Goku fights Cooler while the others battle his robots who have durable armor that they struggle to penetrate. All except Piccolo are captured along with a village of Namekians. Piccolo manages to destroy all of the robots in one large energy attack before making his way to rescue those who were captured. Elsewhere, Goku struggles against Cooler's new "Meta-Cooler" form which gives him the ability to regenerate himself. Cooler also reveals his ability to use the instantaneous movement technique, an ability which Goku also uses. Cooler explains that his ship constantly monitors his body, and fixes any damage it might incur and improves his design to increase his durability. Goku transforms into a Super Saiyan which is also ineffective against Meta-Cooler, and just before he is strangled to death, Vegeta saves him. The two Super Saiyans attack Meta-Cooler together and they manage to destroy him. However, his ship recreates one thousand manifestations of Meta-Cooler, tipping the balance of power decisively against the Saiyans. Goku and Vegeta attempt one final defense but are captured and transported to be converted into fuel.

As his ship is leeching their energy, Cooler explains that after his defeat, his brain was absorbed by the remnants of a spacecraft's computer system and fused together; which he eventually took control of. Goku and Vegeta begin to release all their energy which overloads the system. They encounter the true biological Cooler, who Goku manages to kill with an energy blast. Piccolo arrives and encounters a Meta-Cooler which explodes. All of the Meta-Coolers and robot soldiers subsequently explode and the heroes escape before the ship leaves New Namek's orbit and explodes.

Goku and Vegeta fall from the sky near their allies and everyone rejoices in the victory. In his spaceship, Vegeta crushes the computer chip that created Cooler's ship.

Cast

Music
OP (Opening Theme):
 "Cha-La Head-Cha-La"
 Lyrics by Yukinojō Mori
 Music by Chiho Kiyooka
 Arranged by Kenji Yamamoto
 Performed by Hironobu Kageyama
ED (Ending Theme):

 Lyrics by Dai Satō
 Music by Chiho Kiyooka
 Arranged by Kenji Yamamoto
 Performed by Hironobu Kageyama and Yuka

English dub soundtracks
The score for the English dub's composed by Mark Menza. The Double Feature release contains an alternate audio track containing the English dub with original Japanese background music by Shunsuke Kikuchi, an opening theme of "Cha-La Head-Cha-La", and an ending theme of  "Hero (You’re The Hero)".

The dub made in the Philippines contained English versions of the Japanese opening and ending theme songs.

Releases
It was released on DVD and VHS in North America on August 13, 2002. It was later released in Double Feature set along with Cooler's Revenge (1991) for Blu-ray and DVD on November 11, 2008, both feature full 1080p format in HD remastered 16:9 aspect ratio and an enhanced 5.1 surround mix. The film was re-released to DVD in remastered thinpak collection on December 6, 2011, containing the second 4 Dragon Ball Z films.

Reception

Other companies
A fourth English dub released in Malaysia by Speedy Video features an unknown cast.

References

External links
 Official anime website of Toei Animation
 
 

1992 films
1992 anime films
Return of Cooler
Films directed by Daisuke Nishio
Films set on fictional planets
Funimation
Toei Animation films
Films scored by Shunsuke Kikuchi
Anime and manga about revenge